Charlie Mark Wakefield (born 10 April 1998) is an English professional footballer who plays as a winger for Yeovil Town.

Career
Born in Worthing, Wakefield began his career with Brighton & Hove Albion and Chelsea. He signed a loan deal with Stevenage in August 2017, but never played for the club due to injury.

He moved to Coventry City in January 2019. He was released by Coventry at the end of the 2019–20 season.

Wakefield signed for Wealdstone on a short-term deal on 2 October 2020.

On 7 January 2021, Wakefield signed for National League side Bromley following his departure from Wealdstone.

At the end of the 2020–21 season, Wakefield signed for fellow National League side Yeovil Town on a one-year deal following his departure from Bromley. He extended his contract for another season in June 2022.

He has represented England at under-16 and under-17 youth international levels.

Career statistics

References

1998 births
Living people
English footballers
Chelsea F.C. players
Stevenage F.C. players
Coventry City F.C. players
Wealdstone F.C. players
Bromley F.C. players
Yeovil Town F.C. players
English Football League players
Association football wingers
England youth international footballers
Sportspeople from Worthing